Elizabeth Pearce may refer to:

Beth Pearce, Vermont government official
Elizabeth Pearce, character in Caddyshack II